Cutis may refer to several unrelated biological structures:

 Cutis (anatomy), the outermost layers of skin
 Cutis (mycology), a type of pileipellis in a fungus

Other
 Cutis (journal), an academic journal of dermatology published by Frontline Medical Communications
 Cutiş, a village in Almașu Commune, Sălaj County, Romania